The Cambridge is a modern British breed of domestic sheep. It was bred at the University of Cambridge by John Owen and Alun Davies between about 1964 and 1979, with the aim of increasing prolificacy. It is among the most prolific of all sheep breeds, but is critically endangered.

History 

The Cambridge was bred at the University of Cambridge by John Owen and Alun Davies between about 1964 and 1979, with the specific aim of increasing prolificacy. Ewes of a variety of British breeds were put to Finnsheep rams. These ewes were mostly of the Clun Forest breed, but Border Leicester, Hill Radnor, Kerry Hill, Llanwenog, Lleyn and Ryeland stock was also used.A flock-book was started in 1969, and by 1979 the breed was established.

Characteristics 

The Cambridge is a polled sheep of medium to large size. It is uniformly brown, with a brown face.

Ewes of the breed are among the most prolific of any breed of sheep, with average litter sizes for one-, two- and three-year-old ewes of 1.7, 2.5 and 2.9 respectively.

References

Further reading 

 J.B. Owen, Sarah R.E. Crees, Janet C. Williams, D.A.R. Davies (1986). Prolificacy and 50-day lamb weight of ewes in the Cambridge sheep breed. Animal Science. 42 (3): 355–363. .
 J.B. Owen, I. Ap Dewi (1988). The Cambridge sheep — its exploitation for increased efficiency of lamb production. Agricultural and Food Science. 60 (6): 585–590. .
 J.B. Owen, C.J. Whitaker, R.F.E. Axford, I. Ap Dewi (1990). Expected consequences of the segregation of a major gene in a sheep population in relation to observations on the ovulation rate of a flock of Cambridge sheep. Animal Science. 51 (2): 277–282. >
 I. Ap Dewi, J.B. Owen, A. El-Sheikh, R.F.E. Axford, M. Beigi-Nassiri (1996). Variation in Ovulation Rate and Litter Size of Cambridge Sheep. Animal Science 62 (3): 489–495. .
 J.B. Owen (1996). The Cambridge breed. In: Mohamed H. Fahmy (editor) (1996). Prolific Sheep. Wallingford: CAB International. , pages 161–173.

Sheep breeds originating in the United Kingdom
Sheep breeds